Beate Köstel (née Gauß, born 10 August 1984) is a German sports shooter. She competed in the Women's 10 metre air rifle event at the 2012 Summer Olympics.

References

External links
 
 
 
 
  

1984 births
Living people
German female sport shooters
Olympic shooters of Germany
Shooters at the 2012 Summer Olympics
Sportspeople from Tübingen
Shooters at the 2015 European Games
European Games competitors for Germany
21st-century German women